Slide is an unincorporated community in Lubbock County, Texas, United States. It lies at the junction of FM 1730 and FM 41, 13 miles south of Lubbock, and has an estimated population of 44. The community is part of the  Lubbock metropolitan area.

History
Established in the 1890s, Slide is the second-oldest remaining community in Lubbock County, behind Lubbock itself. Originally known as Block Twenty, the community got its unusual name in 1903 when surveyor W.D. Sandefer discovered that most of Block Twenty's structures had been built about 2 miles east of their proper locations.
To rectify the error, all of the community's buildings were placed on skids and 'slid' 2 miles to the west, and Block Twenty was henceforth referred to as Slide to commemorate the event.

Throughout its history, Slide has remained a rural cotton-farming community; its population never has exceeded 50 residents. Slide did have its own post office twice in its history,  from 1904-1915 and from 1917-1929. The last businesses closed in the 1970s, but the community's population remained unchanged at about 44, a figure it maintained through to the 2000 Census.

Education
Slide is served by the Lubbock-Cooper Independent School District.

See also
Llano Estacado
Caprock Escarpment

References

External links

Unincorporated communities in Lubbock County, Texas
Lubbock metropolitan area
Unincorporated communities in Texas
1890s establishments in Texas